Davis is a town in Tucker County, West Virginia, United States, situated along the Blackwater River. The population was 595 at the 2020 census.

History

Davis was named either for Senator Henry Gassaway Davis, or for his family generally.

The Herman August Meyer House was listed on the National Register of Historic Places in 2010.

Geography
Davis is located at  (39.131110, -79.466318). It is located in the northern portion of Canaan Valley, West Virginia near the Canaan Valley State Resort Park, and is partially surrounded by the Monongahela National Forest, including scenic Blackwater Falls.

At an elevation of 3,520 feet, Davis has the highest elevation of any West Virginia town.

Mountain biking
The area surrounding Davis is renowned for its mountain biking trails and bike culture. The most notable trails include the Plantation Trail, Hoo Doo Hustle and Moon Rocks. Many more miles of trails are also easily accessible at nearby Blackwater Falls State Park. The area also hosts several mountain bike races each year. One of these races, the Revenge of the Rattlesnake, is considered one of the toughest bike races in the country.

Demographics

2010 census
At the 2010 census there were 660 people, 305 households, and 173 families living in the town. The racial makeup of the town was 98.0% White, 0.5% Native American, 0.5% from other races, and 1.1% from two or more races. Hispanic or Latino people of any race were 0.9%.

Of the 305 households 20.0% had children under the age of 18 living with them, 43.6% were married couples living together, 9.2% had a female householder with no husband present, 3.9% had a male householder with no wife present, and 43.3% were non-families. 37.4% of households were one person and 15.4% were one person aged 65 or older. The average household size was 2.16 and the average family size was 2.82.

The median age in the town was 46.1 years. 17.7% of residents were under the age of 18; 6.8% were between the ages of 18 and 24; 24.1% were from 25 to 44; 34.9% were from 45 to 64; and 16.5% were 65 or older. The gender makeup of the town was 47.0% male and 53.0% female.

2000 census
At the 2000 census there were 624 people, 290 households, and 176 families living in the town. The population density was 546.0 inhabitants per square mile (211.3/km2). There were 380 housing units at an average density of 332.5 per square mile (128.7/km2). The racial makeup of the town was 97.92% White, 0.16% Native American, and 1.92% from two or more races. Hispanic or Latino people of any race were 0.32%.

Of the 290 households 26.2% had children under the age of 18 living with them, 44.5% were married couples living together, 11.7% had a female householder with no husband present, and 39.3% were non-families. 36.9% of households were one person and 20.0% were one person aged 65 or older. The average household size was 2.15 and the average family size was 2.76.

The age distribution was 22.0% under the age of 18, 6.1% from 18 to 24, 26.6% from 25 to 44, 23.4% from 45 to 64, and 22.0% 65 or older. The median age was 42 years. For every 100 females, there were 84.6 males. For every 100 females age 18 and over, there were 88.0 males.

The median household income was $25,221 and the median family income was $31,333. Males had a median income of $21,607 versus $17,250 for females. The per capita income for the town was $22,399. About 14.6% of families and 14.6% of the population were below the poverty line, including 19.4% of those under age 18 and 10.9% of those age 65 or over.

Climate
The climate in this area has mild differences between highs and lows, and there is adequate rainfall year-round. According to the Köppen Climate Classification system, Davis has a marine west coast climate, abbreviated "Cfb" on climate maps.

Notable people
 Eddie Baker, film actor
 Karl Lashley, psychologist
 Frankie Yankovic, known as "America's Polka King"

References

Coal towns in West Virginia
Davis and Elkins family
Towns in Tucker County, West Virginia
Towns in West Virginia